The 2011 Aguascalientes Open was a professional tennis tournament played on clay courts. It was the first edition of the tournament which was part of the 2011 ATP Challenger Tour. It took place in Aguascalientes, Mexico between 26 September and 2 October 2011.

ATP entrants

Seeds

 1 Rankings are as of September 19, 2011.

Other entrants
The following players received wildcards into the singles main draw:
  José Enrique Hernández
  Eduardo Magadan-Castro
  Marco Aurei Núñez
  Carlos Velasco

The following players received entry from the qualifying draw:
  Haydn Lewis
  César Ramírez
  Nima Roshan
  Manuel Sánchez

Champions

Singles

 Juan Sebastián Cabal def.  Robert Farah, 6–4, 7–6(7–3)

Doubles

 Daniel Garza /  Santiago González def.  Júlio César Campozano /  Víctor Estrella, 6–4, 5–7, [11–9]

References

Aguascalientes Open
Clay court tennis tournaments
Tennis tournaments in Mexico
2011 in Mexican tennis